James Ellington "Jenks" Simmons (April 3, 1903 – January 16, 1977) was an American football back who played two seasons in the National Football League (NFL) with the Cleveland Bulldogs and Providence Steam Roller. He played college football at Southwestern Oklahoma State University and attended Sentinel High School in Sentinel, Oklahoma.

College career
Simmons participated in football, basketball, track and baseball for the Southwestern Oklahoma State Bulldogs. He made a half-court shot at the buzzer to beat rival Phillips for the conference title in basketball. He was inducted into the Southwestern Oklahoma State Athletic Hall of Fame in 1963.

Professional career
Simmons played in twelve games, starting six, for the NFL's Cleveland Bulldogs in 1927. He played in eight games, starting four, for the Providence Steam Roller of the NFL during the 1928 season.

Coaching career
Simmons coached basketball at Northeastern State University for seven years. He later coached basketball at El Reno High School, winning the state championship in 1932, 1933, 1946, 1949 and 1953. His 1933 and 1949 teams were undefeated.

References

External links
Just Sports Stats

1903 births
1977 deaths
American football running backs
American football defensive backs
American male track and field athletes
American men's basketball coaches
American men's basketball players
Baseball players from Oklahoma
Basketball coaches from Oklahoma
Basketball players from Oklahoma
Cleveland Bulldogs players
Northeastern State RiverHawks men's basketball coaches
Providence Steam Roller players
Southwestern Oklahoma State Bulldogs baseball players
Southwestern Oklahoma State Bulldogs football players
Southwestern Oklahoma State Bulldogs men's basketball players
College men's track and field athletes in the United States
High school basketball coaches in the United States
People from Washita County, Oklahoma
Players of American football from Oklahoma